Dolní Chvatliny is a municipality and village in Kolín District in the Central Bohemian Region of the Czech Republic. It has about 500 inhabitants.

Administrative parts
Villages of Horní Chvatliny and Mančice are administrative parts of Dolní Chvatliny.

History
The first written mention of Chvatliny, when Dolní Chvatliny and Horní Chvatliny have not yet been distinguished, is from 1250.

References

Villages in Kolín District